November 14 - Eastern Orthodox liturgical calendar - November 16

All fixed commemorations below are observed on November 28 by Orthodox Churches on the Old Calendar.

For November 15, Orthodox Churches on the Old Calendar commemorate the Saints listed on November 2.

Saints

 Martyr Demetrius of Thrace, from the village Davoudio (Dabuda), close to town Amapasos (Amapas), by beheading (298)
 Holy Martyrs and Confessors Gurias (299), Samonas (306), and Abibus (322), of Edessa.
 Saint Quinctian, Bishop of Seleucia (4th century)
 Martyrs Eupsychios, Nearchos and Karterios.  (see also: November 5)
 Martyrs Elpidius, Marcellus, and Eustochius, who suffered under Julian the Apostate (361)  (see also: November 16 - West)
 Saint Thomas the New, Patriarch of Constantinople (665-668)

Pre-Schism Western saints

 Saint Eugene, preached the Gospel with St Denis, Bishop of Paris in France, and was martyred.
 Saint Felix of Nola, first Bishop of Nola near Naples in Italy, martyred with thirty companions (287)
 Twenty Martyrs (Fidentian, Valerian, Victoria, etc.) in North Africa.
 Saint Luperius, Bishop of Verona and Confessor (6th or 8th century)
 Saint Malo (Maclovius, Machutis, Maclou), first Bishop of Aleth (c. 640)  (see also: November 14)
 Saint Desiderius (Didier), who succeeded his own brother, St Rusticus, as Bishop of Cahors in France (655)
 Saint Machudd (Machell), founder of the monastery of Llanfechell in Anglesey in Wales (7th century)
 Saint Paduinus (Pavin), a monk at the monastery of St Vincent in Le Mans in France, then first Abbot of St Mary's near Le Mans (c. 703)
 Saint Arnulf, Bishop of Toul in France (871)
 Saint Findan (Fintan), hermit (879)

Post-Schism Orthodox saints

 Venerable Philip, Abbot of Rabang, Vologda (1457)
 Venerable Paisius (Velichkovsky) of Moldavia and Mt. Athos (1794)

New martyrs and confessors

 New Hieromartyrs Nicholas and Peter Kondarov, priests, Gregory Dolinin{{#tag:ref|See:  http://www.pravenc.ru/text/166597.html ГРИГОРИЙ]. Православная Энциклопедия под редакцией Патриарха Московского и всея Руси Кирилла (электронная версия). (Orthodox Encyclopedia - Pravenc.ru).|group=note}} and Nicetas Almazov, deacons (1937)

Other commemorations

 Beginning of the Nativity Fast. Commemoration of the pious Emperor Justin and Theodora.
 "Kupyatich" Icon (1180) of the Most Holy Theotokos.
 Repose of St. Herman of Alaska, Wonderworker of Alaska (1836)
 Repose of Abbot Arsenie Boca of Romania (1989).

Icon gallery

Notes

References

Sources
 November 15 / December 28. Orthodox Calendar (PRAVOSLAVIE.RU).
 November 28 / November 15. Holy Trinity Russian Orthodox Church (A parish of the Patriarchate of Moscow).
 November 15. OCA - The Lives of the Saints.
 The Autonomous Orthodox Metropolia of Western Europe and the Americas (ROCOR). St. Hilarion Calendar of Saints for the year of our Lord 2004. St. Hilarion Press (Austin, TX). p. 85.
 The Fifteenth Day of the Month of November. Orthodoxy in China.
 November 15. Latin Saints of the Orthodox Patriarchate of Rome.
 The Roman Martyrology. Transl. by the Archbishop of Baltimore. Last Edition, According to the Copy Printed at Rome in 1914. Revised Edition, with the Imprimatur of His Eminence Cardinal Gibbons. Baltimore: John Murphy Company, 1916. p. 352-353.
 Rev. Richard Stanton. A Menology of England and Wales, or, Brief Memorials of the Ancient British and English Saints Arranged According to the Calendar, Together with the Martyrs of the 16th and 17th Centuries. London: Burns & Oates, 1892. pp. 542–544.Greek Sources Great Synaxaristes:  15 ΝΟΕΜΒΡΙΟΥ. ΜΕΓΑΣ ΣΥΝΑΞΑΡΙΣΤΗΣ.
  Συναξαριστής. 15 Νοεμβρίου. ECCLESIA.GR. (H ΕΚΚΛΗΣΙΑ ΤΗΣ ΕΛΛΑΔΟΣ). 
  15/11/2015. Ορθόδοξος Συναξαριστής. Russian Sources'''
  28 ноября (15 ноября). Православная Энциклопедия под редакцией Патриарха Московского и всея Руси Кирилла (электронная версия). (Orthodox Encyclopedia - Pravenc.ru).

November in the Eastern Orthodox calendar